Epermenia pontificella is a moth of the  family Epermeniidae. It is found in most of Europe and Asia Minor.

The larvae feed on Thesium montanum.

References

Moths described in 1796
Epermeniidae
Moths of Europe
Moths of Asia